Pataveh District is a district (bakhsh) in Dana County, Kohgiluyeh and Boyer-Ahmad Province, Iran. At the 2006 census, its population was 25,353, in 5,066 families.  The District has one city: Pataveh. The District has two rural districts (dehestan): Pataveh Rural District and Sadat Mahmudi Rural District.

References 

Districts of Kohgiluyeh and Boyer-Ahmad Province
Dana County